Ştefan Gheorghiu may refer to:
Ștefan Gheorghiu (trade unionist) (1879–1914), Romanian activist
Ştefan Gheorghiu (violinist) (1926–2010), Romanian violinist
Ştefan Gheorghiu, the name under the Communist regime and until 1996 of Chichineţu village, Ciocile Commune, Brăila County, Romania

Gheorghiu, Stefan